Events from the year 1723 in Sweden

Incumbents
 Monarch – Frederick I

Events

 January – The Estates of the Realm is assembled. The party in favor of naming Charles Frederick, Duke of Holstein-Gottorp as heir to the throne is strengthened, supported by the Empire of Russia.  
 The Estates of the Realm passes a new Order on Parliamentary Proceedings, which will be a cornerstone of the Age of Liberty in Sweden. It is one of the fundamental laws of Sweden together with the Instrument of Government of 1719/1720.
 January – Frederick I tries, but fail, to strengthen the royal power against the parliament with the support of Hovpartiet, the Holstein Party fills the royal council with its followers, and Arvid Horn become a leading force within Swedish politics.  
 1 May - A great fire in Stockholm destroys the Katarina Church and a large part of the city around it. 
 17 October - A law is passed, in which the Riksdag of the Estates is granted power over the monarch and the royal council. 
 - The farmers of the state are allowed to buy the land they use.
 - The Lutheran church begin to persecute Pietism, which is becoming popular in Sweden and spreading by the home coming Carolean soldiers from the Great Northern War.
 - A new educational law is passed were all parents are obliged ensure that their children knows how to read and write.  
 - A French opera company, the Académie royale de musique (Stockholm), are employed to perform at Bollhuset.

Births

 5 April  - Catherine Charlotte De la Gardie, countess and heroine, famed as a pioneer of vaccination and for preventing a witch trial   (died 1763) 
 9 May - Pehr Osbeck,  explorer, naturalist   (died 1805) 
 11 October -  Hedvig Strömfelt, psalm writer and a leading member of Moravian Church   (died 1766) 
 - Maria Carowsky, painter (died 1793)
 - Eva Merthen, war heroine (died 1811)
 Catharina Justander, Finnish (Swedish) pietist missionary  (died 1778)

Deaths

 
 - Beata Elisabet von Königsmarck, countess and landowner   (born 1637)

References

 
Years of the 18th century in Sweden
Sweden